Almería railway station is the main railway station of the Spanish city of Almería, Andalusia.

History

Almería's railway station originally opened in 1893 as the terminus for the line to Madrid. In 2005, the railway and bus station were combined in a new location next to the old station building.

The number of passengers at the station has decreased considerably in the 2000s; in 2000 the station was used by 240,344 passengers, but had decreased to 107,409 in 2017.

Services
Almería is served by Media Distancia trains to Linares Baeza and Granada, along with Intercity services to Madrid Atocha which takes around six hours.

Future
Almería is the future terminus of the Murcia–Almería high-speed rail line, which will link Almería to Madrid Atocha via Murcia del Carmen, Albacete-Los Llanos and Cuenca–Fernando Zóbel.

References

Buildings and structures in Almería
Railway stations in Andalusia
Railway stations in Spain opened in 1893